The Dawn of Love is a lost 1916 silent film drama directed by Edwin Carewe and starring Mabel Taliaferro. It was produced by B. A. Rolfe and distributed through Metro Pictures.

Cast
Mabel Taliaferro - Jacqueline Allen
Robert Frazer - John Lang (*as Robert W. Frazer)
Leslie Stowe - Miles Allen (*as Leslie M. Stowe)
Peter Lang - Captain Ben Durling
Martin J. Faust - Ward Jennings
D. H. Turner - Chief of the Revenue Office
Frank Bates - His Assistant
John M. La Mond - Tim(*as Jack La Mond)

References

External links
The Dawn of Love @ IMDb.com
Allmovie/synopsis(under its Swedish release title)

1916 films
American silent feature films
Lost American films
1916 drama films
American black-and-white films
Silent American drama films
Metro Pictures films
1916 lost films
Lost drama films
Films directed by Edwin Carewe
1910s American films